Salah al-Din al-Sabbagh (1899 – 16 October 1945) was an Iraqi Army officer and Arab nationalist that led the Golden Square group which had opposed the government at the time and had highly influenced politics between the years of 1939 and 1941.

Biography
Born in Mosul to Iraqi parents, he was educated there and later attended the Ottoman Military College in Istanbul, where he graduated as an officer in 1915.

Sabbagh served in Palestine and Macedonia during World War I where he was imprisoned only to later joined Amir Faisal I ibn Hussein, who became king of Iraq, and then returned to Iraq in 1921 to partake in the Iraqi army. His military education extends to courses taken both in Belgium and Britain. In 1924 he became an instructor at the Baghdad Military College where he later taught at the Staff College. Sabbagh was then awarded the position of assistant chief of staff of the Iraqi army in 1937.

He was an Arab nationalist which led him to become the head of the Golden Square between 1939 and 1941, a group of army officers that had placed heavy influence on Iraq's political scene. During this period, and relating to being an army officer and a pan-Arab nationalist, al-Sabbagh supervised the training of al-Futuwwah youth movement. Established in 1935, and made compulsory for high school students in 1939, the futuwwah movement, via its paramilitary training, sought to transform young Iraqi-Arab youth into future soldiers committed to the cultural, historical, geographical and national unity of the Arab nation.

Having admired the Grand Mufti of Jerusalem, Mohammad Amin al-Husayni, he worked both with him and Rashid Ali al-Kaylani to negotiate with the Axis powers for support of their pan-Arab goals. Al-Sabbagh supported Rashid Ali as prime minister in 1941 and was responsible as a major advocate of the Anglo-Iraqi War in April and May. Soon after the Iraqi defeat in the Anglo-Iraqi War of 1941, Sabbagh fled to Iran and later to Turkey. He was later extradited to Iraq and publicly hanged in 1945.

Sabbagh had written an autobiography titled "Fursan al-Uruba fi al-Iraq" ("The knights of Arabism in Iraq"), which had been published in Damascus in 1956 which had detailed the account of his pan-Arabism.

References

1889 births
1945 deaths
Iraqi Arab nationalists
Executed military personnel
Golden Square members
Iraqi Ground Forces officers
Iraqi people of Lebanese descent
Iraqi writers
Ottoman military personnel of World War I
People extradited from Turkey
People extradited to Iraq
People from Mosul
People executed by Iraq by hanging
People who were court-martialed
Executed Iraqi collaborators with Nazi Germany